Suena is a Papuan language spoken in Morobe Province, in the "tail" of Papua New Guinea. It is part of the Binanderean family of the Trans–New Guinea phylum of languages.

The Yarawi people spoke Suena during most of the 20th century, but may have switched to Binandere.

References

External links 
 

Critically endangered languages
Languages of Morobe Province
Greater Binanderean languages